Bylbasivka is an urban-type settlement in Kramatorsk Raion (district) in Donetsk Oblast of eastern Ukraine. Population:

References

Urban-type settlements in Kramatorsk Raion